Brisco railway station (NY4313251259) in St Cuthbert Without parish, was situated on the Lancaster and Carlisle Railway (the West Coast Main Line) between Carlisle and Penrith. It served the rural district of Brisco and Newbiggin Hall, Cumbria, England. The station opened on 17 December 1846, and closed in December 1852.

The station
The station had two platforms and a station master's house. The station house remains, the platforms have been demolished. It proved to be unviable and the decision was made to close it in favour of Wreay railway station that was located nearby.

Stations on the line
The next station on the line towards Carlisle was Carlisle and the preceding station was Wreay.

References
Notes

Sources

External links
Old Cumbria Gazetteer

Disused railway stations in Cumbria
Railway stations in Great Britain opened in 1846
Railway stations in Great Britain closed in 1852
Former Lancaster and Carlisle Railway stations
1846 establishments in England